Thorngumbald is a village and civil parish in the East Riding of Yorkshire, England, in an area known as Holderness,  east of Hull on the A1033. The civil parish is formed by the village and the hamlets of Camerton and Ryehill. At the 2011 census, it had a population of 3,392, an increase on the 2001 UK census figure of 3,106.

History
Thorngumbald was once a Viking settlement – the official emblem of Thorngumbald is a Viking helmet with wings. The name was first recorded in the Domesday Book as "Torn", an Old English word meaning 'thorn bush'. The name was still in use in 1228, but by 1260 it had become "Thorne". In the lay subsidy rolls of Edward 1, 1297, it is given as Thorengumbald. A Baron Gumbaud had settled in the area, adding his name to the original and giving the village its present name. The Gumbaud name was associated with the local Lord of the manor in the 13th century. By the 17th century the village had had different spellings, including Thorgumbaud, Thorngumbold, Thorneygumbald and Gumberthorn. The current name has been in use since then. The Gumbaud family still live in the village.

Community
The parish church of St Mary is a Grade II listed building. The village also had a Methodist church, built 1904. However the stones of the church were relaid in 1984.

The village shopping centre has five shops: a small Boots chemist, a newsagents, a deli / sandwich shop, and a fish and chip shop. A newly refurbished mini supermarket was opened in 2021. Elsewhere in the village there are three hairdressing salons, a Chinese takeaway, the Royal Mail public house (demolished early 2017), The New Royal Mail Public house, a restaurant, a Royal Mail post office.

Thorngumbald Primary School hosts meetings for local organisations, such as the Brownies and St John Ambulance which provide weekly activities for children and teenagers.

The local parish offers courses, such as ICT, for people within the village at the local Village Hall on the main road (A1033).

Bowls is also played at the Village Hall along with table tennis. There are also line dancing classes at the Village Institute.  The Village Hall and the Parish Councillors organise an annual Scarecrow Trail that takes place throughout the village every summer. People of all ages are involved, with the prize usually a trophy.

The village is home to England rugby league international Jon Wilkin and former Hull City player Chris Chilton.

Education
Thorngumbald Primary School is a local Primary School catering for children aged between 4 and 11. The school is a September 2007 amalgamation of Thorngumbald Infant and Junior Schools, now on a newly built site on Plumtree Road, originally the site used by Thorngumbald Infant School.

South Holderness Technology College in the village of Preston is the nearest secondary school. It caters for students from ages 11 to 16, with a Sixth Form College for those from 16 to 18. Thorngumbald is within the school's catchment area and buses provided by the school transport students of all age groups to and from the village in the morning and afternoon.

In September 2013, the village briefly gained local attention due to bus pass prices to and from South Holderness School. BBC Look North (East Yorkshire and Lincolnshire) were present throughout the village interviewing students and their parents. The prices currently stand at £540 per bus pass for one academic year to travel to and from the school, provided you live three miles or less away from the school. Since this event, there have been a few minor protests including petitions and some of the students who have to pay for the school bus pass, getting on the public bus service as it is much cheaper.

There is a nursery on Grange Road.

Transport
The village was once served by a railway linking Withernsea and Hull at Ryehill and Burstwick station. It closed in 1964 following the Beeching cuts. Thorngumbald is now served by EYMS daily bus routes linking the village to Withernsea and Hull.

Sport

The village has its own football club which competes in the Hull & District Youth Football League And Cup, Thorngumbald Barrons who play their home matches on the playing fields on Plumtree Road.

References

External links

Villages in the East Riding of Yorkshire
Holderness
Civil parishes in the East Riding of Yorkshire